Leszczyc may refer to:
 Leszczyc, Greater Poland Voivodeship, a village in Poland
 Leszczyc coat of arms, a Polish coat of arms
 Andrzej Leszczyc, a fictional character created by Jerzy Skolimowski
 Michał Hieronim Leszczyc-Sumiński (1820–1898), Polish botanist and painter

See also